Anthony J. Camillo (August 11, 1928 – August 29, 2018) was an American record producer, orchestrator and arranger. 

Camillo, born in Somerville, New Jersey, worked on many soul, pop and disco recordings of the 1960s and 1970s, including recordings by Dionne Warwick, Eric Carmen, The Stylistics, Dazz Band, Millie Jackson, The Chambers Brothers, Peaches & Herb, Sha Na Na, Grand Funk Railroad, Stevie Wonder, The 5th Dimension, Martha Reeves, The Supremes, Parliament, and Tommy James. 

He co-produced and arranged Gladys Knight and The Pips' 1973 number one hit, "Midnight Train to Georgia", which was awarded a Grammy Award. He co-wrote and produced the group's 1974 hit, "I Feel a Song" which was a Billboard R&B number one (#21 pop). 

In the early 1970s, he spent some time working in Detroit with Motown and also the Holland-Dozier-Holland production team on their Invictus and Hot Wax labels before returning to his New Jersey base. In the late 70s and early 80s, he co-owned a recording label, Venture Records, whose biggest success came in 1982 with Canadian duo, Chéri. Their song, "Murphy's Law" reached #5 R&B, #39 pop.

Camillo also assembled the studio group Bazuka, which scored a Top Ten hit in the US in 1975 with "Dynomite". The track peaked at #28 in the UK Singles Chart in June 1975.

Later in his career, Camillo turned to writing and scoring for films, including the horror film Welcome to Arrow Beach (1974), the Blaxploitation film Hangup (1974), and the action movies The Survivalist (1987) and Night Vision (1997). In 1994, he founded Venture Music Group, a licensing group, and served as its CEO. He operated his own studio in New Jersey for over 30 years until his death.

Camillo died on August 29, 2018 at the age of 90.

References

1928 births
2018 deaths
Musicians from Somerville, New Jersey
Record producers from New Jersey
American music arrangers